Andrey Leonidovich Melnichenko (born 21 May 1992) is a Russian cross-country skier who competes internationally.
 
He participated at the 2018 Winter Olympics.

Cross-country skiing results
All results are sourced from the International Ski Federation (FIS).

Olympic Games

World Championships

World Cup

Season standings

Individual podiums
 4 podiums – (2 , 2 )

Team podiums
 5 podiums – (5 )

Notes

References

1992 births
Living people
Russian male cross-country skiers
Cross-country skiers at the 2018 Winter Olympics
Olympic cross-country skiers of Russia
Tour de Ski skiers
Sportspeople from Krasnoyarsk